Santa Anita Dam, also known as Big Santa Anita Dam, is a concrete thin arch dam on Santa Anita Creek in the San Gabriel Mountains of Los Angeles County, California. Owned by the Los Angeles County Flood Control District, the dam serves for flood control, water conservation and debris control. The dam was built between 1923 and 1927. The dam has three valves that control releases of stormwater.

The dam is situated in the steep San Gabriel foothills, north of Sierra Madre and Arcadia. It is located just north of the boundary of the Angeles National Forest. The dam is visible from Santa Anita Canyon Road, which runs along the west slope of the Santa Anita Canyon and provides access into trails further upstream along Santa Anita Creek. The viewing window for the dam is very short, only about a half-mile; the access road which runs down into the canyon from Santa Anita Canyon Road is closed to the public. However, the First Water trail, which leads downstream from Chantry Flat along the creek, is said to provide access to the reservoir.

Since the 1990s the maximum allowed storage of water has been restricted, to ensure that the dam will not collapse due to seismic instability. This has partially caused rapid silting of the reservoir and sediment removal was started in mid-2009.

A staged rescue at the dam was broadcast in November 1958 as an episode of the syndicated U.S. television series Rescue 8 titled "The Chasm".

References

External links 

 Image of workers walking on the face of the Santa Anita Dam during construction, California, circa 1926. Los Angeles Times Photographic Archive (Collection 1429). UCLA Library Special Collections, Charles E. Young Research Library, University of California, Los Angeles.

Dams in Los Angeles County, California
Arch dams
Angeles National Forest
San Gabriel Mountains
Sierra Madre, California
Dams completed in 1927
1927 establishments in California